OPE or Ope may refer to:

 Camp Opemikon
 Operator product expansion
 One Photon Excitation, see also Nonlinear optics
 Ope, a locality in Jämtland County, Sweden
 Street name for opium
 Ope Pasquet (born 1956), Uruguayan politician and lawyer
 Ope Peleseuma (born 1992), New Zealand rugby union footballer
 Operational Preparation of the Environment, US and Russian Intelligence strategic planning technique

See also 
 Clay Ope
 Church Ope Cove